Paranotoreas opipara  is a species of moth in the family Geometridae. This species is endemic to New Zealand. This species was first described by Alfred Philpott in 1915 and named Notoreas opipara. In 1986 Robin C. Craw placed this species within the genus Paranotoreas.

References 

Larentiinae
Moths of New Zealand
Endemic fauna of New Zealand
Moths described in 1915
Taxa named by Alfred Philpott
Endemic moths of New Zealand